Nana Ato Arthur is the member of parliament for Komenda-Edina-Ehuafo-Abirem in the Central region of Ghana.

Personal life 
Nana is married with three children. He is a Christian (Catholic),

Early life and education 
Nana was born on 24 December 1961 in Abrem Berase in the Central region. He attended KNUST where he had MSc in Development Planning and Management. He also had PG Dip in Regional Planning and Management at Universitat Dortmund in Germany. He also had his BSc in Eng at South China Agricultural University in Guangzhou, China. He also had PhD in Development Studies at Centre of Development Research in University of Bonn in 2012 in Germany.

Politics 
Nana is a member of New Patriotic Party. He was the Regional Minister of Central Regional Coordinating Council in Cape Coast from May 2006-January 2009. He was the Deputy regional Minister of Central Regional Coordinating Council in Cape Coast from May 2005- May 2006. He was the DCE of Komenda-Edina-Eguafo-Abrem District Assembly from March 2001-May 2005 in Elmina.

Employment 
He was an Engineer of Ghana Irrigation Development Authority (GIDA) in Accra from March 1991- December 1998. He was the Management Consultant of State Enterprises Commission in Accra from December 1998-March 2001. He is the current Vice-president of the Commonwealth Association for Public Administration and Management (CAPAM),

References 

Living people
Ghanaian Roman Catholics
People from Central Region (Ghana)
Kwame Nkrumah University of Science and Technology alumni
Year of birth missing (living people)
Ghanaian MPs 2013–2017